Jeremiah Longfellow "Jerry" Carpenter (April 13, 1839 – September 29, 1919) was an American politician in the state of Ohio. He served in the Ohio House of Representatives for Meigs County (63rd, 64th General Assemblies) and later the Ohio State Senate for the Eighth District (69th, 70th, 73rd General Assemblies).

Carpenter was born at a farm, Lawnfield, at Columbia Township, Meigs County, Ohio, in 1839, to Jeremiah and Sarah Ann (née Simpson) Carpenter. He was educated in the surrounding schools and became a farmer by occupation, particularly livestock farming. During his time in the Ohio General Assembly, he focused on agricultural educational issues for his particular districts. A Republican, Carpenter was also on many occasions a member of the Ohio State Central Committee. In the Senate, he sat as chairman on the Committee on Agriculture and Penitentiary, and as a member of the Finance, Labor, Common Schools, School Land, Privileges and Elections, Benevolent Institutions, Agriculture, and Rules. His state political service was lauded by the Ohio State Board of Agriculture for his "active interest in the farmers; the agricultural societies, as bodies and as individuals, have never asked anything of him that he didn't take up with pleasure and desire to execute for their interests".

Carpenter was a member of the Freemasons where he was a knight templar.  He served on the Ohio State Board of Agriculture. In 1904, he was named a steward of the State Hospital in Athens, Ohio.

He was married to Mary Hannah Hauk and had three children, Elizabeth Hartinger née Carpenter, Sarah Emily Murphey née Carpenter, and Frankenstein Simpson Carpenter (born 1880). His son, known as simply "Frank", was a lawyer in Mount Sterling, Ohio.

He died at his Athens home on September 29, 1919, of complications of atherosclerosis. He was buried at School Lot Cemetery in what would later become Carpenter, Ohio.

References

1839 births
1919 deaths
People from Meigs County, Ohio
Businesspeople from Ohio
Republican Party members of the Ohio House of Representatives
Republican Party Ohio state senators
19th-century American politicians
19th-century American businesspeople